Doorsteps is a 1916 British silent drama film directed by Henry Edwards and starring Edwards, Florence Turner and Campbell Gullan.

Plot 
Its plot involves a boarding housemaid who befriends a playwright and helps him to evade a dangerous ex-convict on his tail. It was based on a play by Edwards, and was made as a short feature film with a running time of four reels.

Cast
 Florence Turner — Doorsteps
 Henry Edwards — George Newlands
 Campbell Gullan — Tozer
 Amy Lorraine — Mrs. Skipps
 Fred Rains — Stage-manager

References

External links

1916 films
British silent feature films
1916 drama films
Films directed by Henry Edwards
British films based on plays
British drama films
British black-and-white films
1910s English-language films
1910s British films
Silent drama films